Texas Health Huguley Hospital Fort Worth South is a 291-bed acute care hospital in Burleson, Texas that is part of a joint venture company created by AdventHealth and Texas Health Resources.

History
Huguley is named after Herbert T. Huguley, a dentist and a real estate investor of Dallas who provided $6 million in funding for the hospital from his estate in honor of his parents. Huguley Memorial Medical Center opened in February 1977 and was one of the first hospitals in the U.S. to have all private rooms. In 2012 Adventist Health System and Texas Health Resources created a joint venture company that owns and operates the hospital, which later changed its name to Texas Health Huguley Hospital Fort Worth South.

In May 2014, the construction of a new $95 million six story tower with 140 beds was started. The new tower with bigger spacious rooms was opened August 7, 2016. In early 2022, a $73 million expansion started with a new four story tower. Construction will be completed in 2023.

Accreditation
Huguley is accredited by the Joint Commission on Accreditation of Healthcare Organizations (JCAHO).

External links

See also 

 List of Seventh-day Adventist hospitals
 List of hospitals in Texas

References

Hospital buildings completed in 1977
Hospitals in Texas
AdventHealth